Nupserha fasciata is a species of beetle in the family Cerambycidae. It was described by Per Olof Christopher Aurivillius in 1907.

Subspecies
 Nupserha fasciata téocchii F. Vitali & C. Vitali, 2012
 Nupserha fasciata fasciata Aurivillius, 1907

References

fasciata
Beetles described in 1907